The 2018 United States House of Representatives elections in Maine were held on November 6, 2018, to elect the two U.S. representatives from the state of Maine, one from each of the state's two congressional districts. The elections coincided with the elections of other offices, including a gubernatorial election, other elections to the House of Representatives, elections to the United States Senate, and various state and local elections.

These U.S. House elections were conducted with ranked-choice voting, as opposed to a simple plurality, after Maine voters passed a citizen referendum approving the change in 2016 and a June 2018 referendum sustaining the change. Ranked-choice voting was used in the primary elections as well.

While Rep. Chellie Pingree in District 1 was reelected with a majority, no candidate received a majority in District 2, which meant that the ranked-choice tabulation needed to occur. Rep. Bruce Poliquin, who received a plurality of first-round votes, filed a federal lawsuit to halt that tabulation, arguing that ranked-choice voting was unconstitutional. The court ruled against Poliquin in his request for a motion on November 15 and against the lawsuit itself on December 13. On November 15, Jared Golden was declared the winner after the ranked-choice redistribution, becoming the first member of Congress to be elected via ranked-choice voting.

Overview
Results of the 2018 United States House of Representatives elections in Maine by district:

District 1

Chellie Pingree, the incumbent representative, was first elected in 2008, and in 2016 defeated Republican nominee Mark Holbrook with just under 58 percent of the vote. Holbrook ran again for the Republican nomination, and was unopposed. Independent State Representative Marty Grohman, elected as a Democrat in the 2016 State House election, defected from the party in 2017. He launched his campaign for the first district in spring 2018.

Due to the use of ranked-choice voting in the election, Pingree was considered to be vulnerable if she did not win outright in the first round, as Grohman could have been a second choice for Republican and Democratic voters. Grohman was receiving substantial support from Republican elected officials and activists, including Republican Governor Paul LePage and the State Director of President Donald Trump's 2016 presidential campaign Christie-Lee McNally.

Democratic primary

Declared
 Chellie Pingree, incumbent U.S. representative

Results

Republican primary

Declared
Mark Holbrook, professional counselor and 2016 nominee for this seat

Results

Independents

Declared
 Marty Grohman, state representative

Endorsements

General election

Polling

Results

District 2

Bruce Poliquin, the incumbent representative for the second district, defeated Democrat Emily Cain in the 2016 election in a rematch of the 2014 election where Poliquin was first elected. Poliquin ran for the Republican nomination unopposed. Cain did not challenge Poliquin again, instead taking a job with the progressive group Emily's List. Initially, six candidates filed for the Democratic nomination — United States Postal Service employee and activist Phil Cleaves, carpenter and former Maine State Senate candidate Jonathan Fulford, Assistant Majority Leader of the State House of Representatives Jared Golden, shopkeeper and former chair of the Isleboro Board of Selectmen Craig Olson, businessman and former State Senate candidate Tim Rich, and conservationist Lucas St. Clair. Cleaves, Rich and Fulford dropped out at various points in the campaign, though Fulford's withdrawal happened too late for his name to be removed from the primary ballot. Several candidates received prominent endorsements; St. Clair was endorsed by the League of Conservation Voters and California Congressman Jared Huffman, Fulford by the left-wing group Our Revolution prior to his withdrawal from the race, and Golden by VoteVets, Massachusetts Congressman Seth Moulton and over two dozen members of the Maine Legislature. Golden defeated St. Clair and Olson in the second round of the ranked-choice vote tabulation.

In addition, two third-party candidates announced their candidacies for the seat: Houlton Band of Maliseets State Representative Henry John Bear of the Maine Green Independent Party and Brian Kresge of the Libertarian Party. Bear, a former Democrat, left the party due to its stance on water rights for Maine's native people. He failed to qualify for the ballot. Kresge, a veteran and writer, withdrew from the race to run for a seat in the State House of Representatives. Neither the Libertarians nor Green Independents had a candidate on the ballot.

Two independent candidates qualified for the ballot: Tiffany Bond, an attorney from Portland (a city outside of the second district), and Will Hoar, a schoolteacher.

Republican primary

Declared
 Bruce Poliquin, incumbent U.S. representative

Results

Democratic primary

Candidates

Declared
 Jared Golden, Assistant Majority Leader of the Maine House of Representatives
Craig Olson, former chair of the Islesboro Board of Selectmen
 Lucas St. Clair, conservationist, restaurateur, and son of Roxanne Quimby

Withdrawn
Phil Cleaves, United States Postal Service employee
 Jonathan Fulford, farmer, carpenter, and two-time Maine Senate candidate
 Tim Rich, businessman

Declined
 Troy Jackson, Minority Leader of the Maine Senate and candidate for this seat in 2014
 Ben Sprague, Bangor City Councilor

Endorsements

Polling

Fundraising
(Through March 31, 2017)
 Jared Golden: $618,380.33
 Lucas St. Clair: $424,958.42
 Jonathan Fulford (withdrawn): $166,989.79
 Craig Olson: $100,299.00
 Tim Rich (withdrawn): $72,197.20
 Emily Cain (not running): $24,692.88

Results

% (gross) = percent of all valid votes cast (without eliminating the exhausted votes)

% (net) = percent of votes cast after eliminating the exhausted votes

Green primary

Failed to make the ballot
 Henry John Bear, state representative for Houlton Band of Maliseet Indians

Libertarian primary

Withdrawn
 Brian Kresge, writer (running for State House)

Independent candidates
 Tiffany Bond, attorney
 Will Hoar, schoolteacher

General election
All candidates except for Poliquin said they would abide by the results of ranked-choice voting and make second and third choices when they vote.  Poliquin said he would only cast a first-round vote for himself, stating that he felt no one but him is qualified for the seat.

Though Poliquin led in the first round of vote tabulation by 2,171 votes, he did not have a majority of the votes, initiating the ranked-choice tabulation process. Poliquin filed a lawsuit in federal court on November 13, seeking an order to halt the second-round tabulation of ballots and declare ranked-choice voting unconstitutional. Poliquin's request for an injunction to halt the ranked-choice voting process was rejected, shortly before Matthew Dunlap, the Maine Secretary of State, announced Golden as the winner by 3,509 votes after votes for independent candidates Tiffany Bond and Will Hoar were eliminated and ballots with these votes had their second- or third-choice votes counted. Poliquin requested a recount of the ballots just before the deadline of November 26. After several days of counting with the result not being significantly changed, Poliquin ended the recount after incurring $15,000 in fees. Poliquin also stated that his lawsuit would continue and asked Judge Lance Walker, the federal judge hearing his lawsuit, to order a new election be held should he decline to hold ranked-choice voting unconstitutional. Judge Walker ruled against Poliquin on the merits on December 13, rejecting all of his arguments. Poliquin appealed to the Court of Appeals in Boston and requested an order to prevent Golden from being certified as the winner, but that request was rejected. On December 24, Poliquin dropped his lawsuit, allowing Golden to take the seat. As a result, Poliquin became the first incumbent to lose the 2nd Congressional District since 1916, whereas Golden became the first member of Congress to be elected via ranked-choice voting. This also made New England's delegation to the House entirely Democratic for the first time since 2012.

Gov. Paul LePage, as one of his last acts in office, reluctantly initialed the certificate of election for Golden, adding the words "stolen election" to it to express his personal dislike of ranked-choice voting.

Endorsements

Polling

Predictions

Results

% (gross) = percent of all valid votes cast (without eliminating the exhausted votes)

% (net) = percent of votes cast after eliminating the exhausted votes

Poliquin led on first preferences with 46.4% to Golden's 45.6% and 8.1% for the two independents. However, as no candidate had a majority of the votes, the votes cast for the two independents were redistributed between Poliquin and Golden (those that didn't give a preference for either of the candidates were exhausted) and Golden won the election. The reason both independents were eliminated in a single round, as opposed to only the 4th place candidate, was because of the mathematical impossibility of the 3rd place candidate moving into 2nd place even if they had received all of the 4th place candidate's redistributed votes.

Of the votes left in the count, Golden won with 50.62% of the vote to Poliquin's 49.38%. Including exhausted votes, the final count was Golden 49.2%, Poliquin 48.0%, and 2.8% exhausted.

The votes for the two independents were redistributed as follows: 44.5% went to Golden, 20.3% went to Poliquin, and 35.2% were exhausted votes (i.e., they didn't give a preference to either of the remaining candidates).

See also
2018 United States House of Representatives elections

References

External links
Candidates at Vote Smart
Candidates at Ballotpedia
Campaign finance at FEC
Campaign finance at OpenSecrets

Official campaign websites for first district candidates
Marty Grohman (I) for Congress
Mark Holbrook (R) for Congress
Chellie Pingree (D) for Congress

Official campaign websites for second district candidates
Tiffany Bond (I) for Congress
Jared Golden (D) for Congress
Will Hoar (I) for Congress
Bruce Poliquin (R) for Congress

Maine
2018
United States House of Representatives